Chizkiyahu Nebenzahl is the current Rabbi of the Old City of Jerusalem.

Nebenzahl is the youngest son of Rabbi Avigdor Nebenzahl, the previous Rabbi of the Old City. He also serves on the faculty of Yeshivat Netiv Aryeh.

References

External links 
Kollel Kotel

Haredi rabbis in Israel
Living people
Year of birth missing (living people)